Angela Black may refer to:

Angela Black (news anchor), American news anchor
Angela Black (TV series), 2021 British TV series